Workers Party (Rabotnička partija) was a leftist political party in the Republic of Macedonia. It was established in June 1990. First president of the party was Krste Jankovski.

The RP took part in all of the elections in the 1990s. In the 1998 parliamentary elections, the RP had presented a list with 35 candidates, headed by Đuro Keškec. The party received 1,528 votes (0.14%).

Political parties established in 1990
Defunct political parties in North Macedonia
Political parties in Yugoslavia
Left-wing parties
Socialist parties in North Macedonia